Guryongpo is a town, or eup in Nam-gu, Pohang, North Gyeongsang Province, South Korea. The township Changju-myeon was upgraded to the town Guryongpo-eup in 1942. Guryongpo Town Office is located in Hudong-ri.

Communities
Guryongpo-eup is divided into 10 villages (ri).

References

External links
Official website 

Pohang
Towns and townships in North Gyeongsang Province